"Get By" is a song by American hip hop recording artist Talib Kweli. It was released on March 11, 2003 as the third single from his debut studio album Quality (2002). The hip hop song, produced by Kanye West, samples "Sinnerman" as performed by Nina Simone and features background vocals from Abby Dobson, Chinua Hawk, Kendra Ross, Vernetta Bobien, and William "Na2" Taylor. The song peaked at number 77 on the US Billboard Hot 100 and at number 29 on the US Billboard Hot R&B/Hip-Hop Songs, becoming Kweli's most successful solo hit.

Remix
A remix was later released featuring verses from fellow American rappers Mos Def, Jay-Z, Busta Rhymes, Kanye West and Snoop Dogg. A full-fledged posse cut, the former three are also from Brooklyn, New York City, like Kweli. The radio version of the remix featured only Busta Rhymes and Jay-Z, with lengthier versions of theirs and Kweli's verses.

Music video 

A music video was recorded and released in 2003, and, much like the song, it focuses on the lives and struggles of low income people from a wide range of cultural and racial backgrounds living in and around New York City. Parts of the video were filmed in Chinatown and Times Square. The song's producer Kanye West is featured in the video alongside Kweli.

In popular culture
In 2008, Atlanta-based rapper Rocko released a song titled "Dis Morning", from his debut album Self Made, which interpolates Kweli's "Get By". Also in 2008, "Get By" was featured in the comedy film First Sunday, as well as the film's soundtrack. In 2009, North Carolina-bred rapper J. Cole, freestyled over the song's production, which was featured on his 2009 mixtape The Warm Up.

On the December 12, 2016 episode of the American satirical show Full Frontal with Samantha Bee, Kweli and writer Ashley Nicole Black modified the lyrics of "Get By" to one that touts the benefits of online encryption.

Charts

References

2003 singles
Talib Kweli songs
Kanye West songs
Song recordings produced by Kanye West
Songs written by Kanye West
Songs written by Nina Simone
2003 songs
Songs written by Talib Kweli